William Davies Trembath Brunier (28 April 1889 – 3 July 1956) was an Australian rules football player who served in the Australian Imperial Force during World War I.

Football career
Brunier made his debut for Melbourne in the Victorian Football League in Round 15 of the 1914 VFL season, finishing the season having played three matches. He returned for the 1915 season and played two matches. After a break due to military service he rejoined Melbourne in 1919, playing four matches. He finished his VFL career having played nine matches, scoring eight goals.

Cricket career
In 1911 Brunier made the first of 19 first grade appearances for St Kilda and Melbourne in Victorian grade cricket.

Military service
Brunier enlisted with the Army in June 1917 and left for the War in November 1917 on the HMAT Nestor. He returned to Australia in January 1919.

References

External links

DemonWiki profile

1889 births
Melbourne Football Club players
Collegians Football Club players
Australian military personnel of World War I
Melbourne Cricket Club cricketers
Australian people of Cornish descent
Australian rules footballers from Melbourne
1956 deaths
People from Carlton, Victoria
Military personnel from Melbourne